This following is the discography for Swedish metal band The Haunted.

Albums

Studio albums

Live albums

Compilation albums

Videos

Video albums

Music videos

References 

Discographies of Swedish artists
Heavy metal group discographies
Discography